The Admiral David Glasgow Farragut Gravesite is the final resting place of David Glasgow Farragut (1801–1870), the first rear admiral, vice admiral, and four-star admiral of the United States Navy.  He was most well known for his order to "Damn the torpedoes, full speed ahead."  The granite and marble monument resembling a mast marks not only his burial site, but that of his wife, son and daughter-in-law. It was listed as a National Historic Landmark on the National Register of Historic Places on October 16, 2012.  It is located in Woodlawn Cemetery in the Bronx, itself a National Historic Landmark.  It is the only surviving place of high quality with a direct association to Farragut's life.

Description
The Farragut grave site is located in Woodlawn Cemetery's northeastern Aurora Hill section.  It is set in a circular plot that is part of a larger lozenge-shaped section bounded on the east by East Boundary Drive, and the west by Daisy and Ravine Drives.  The plot is ringed by a paved walkway, and the main monument is set on a local high point.  From the ground level up, the monument consists of a granite foundation block, a marble pedestal, and a marble column.  The column is intricately carved with depictions of events in Farragut's life, and is designed to resemble a part of a wooden ship mast. The top of the column consists of a carved representation of a draped American flag.  At the base of the column are carved representations of naval-themed objects, as well as representations of Farragut's Civil War flagship the USS Hartford, and Forts Jackson and Philips, whose guns he famously ran past during the Capture of New Orleans.  The pedestal is basically square, with carved words describing Farragut's deeds. The memorial was carved by the firm of Casoni & Isola, based on New York but owning marble quarries in Italy.

See also
 List of National Historic Landmarks in New York City

References

External links
 Farragut Gravesite
 

Buildings and structures on the National Register of Historic Places in New York City
Buildings and structures in the Bronx
Monuments and memorials on the National Register of Historic Places in New York (state)
National Historic Landmarks in New York City
Burials at Woodlawn Cemetery (Bronx, New York)
National Register of Historic Places in the Bronx